Vivian Reddy (born Vathasallum Reddy) is a South African Indian of South Indian descent and the founder of the Edison Group. 
Reddy is the son of a teacher and the youngest of nine children. He was chosen as South Africa's first representative to the Boy Scouts Jamboree in Japan. It was there that he met his inspiration Neil Armstrong.
Born in Durban, he has created a business empire with interests in energy, casinos, healthcare, financial services and property development. As at July 2017, a forensic report links Reddy's Edison group to "irregular" Johannesburg City Power deals.

Philanthropic work 
Reddy is involved in several South African charity initiatives such as the Orphans of AIDS Trust Fund. He has donated substantially to various community projects such the Wingen Heights Secondary School building project and donating R6million to the eThekwini Metropolitan Municipality to build a clinic. He treated the residents of Bayview, Chatsworth to a Diwali celebration in commemoration of 150 years of Indian settlement in South Africa since 1860.

Achievements 
1992 Four Outstanding South Africans (FOYSA Award)
1993 International Senate Award
1993 Distinguished Service Award
1993 South African Young Achiever Award
1998 Rotary International – Paul Harris Community Service Award
2003 Global Indian Entrepreneur of the Year Award
2007 Voted the Most Admired Businessperson in KwaZulu-Natal
2009 Award for Sustainable Contribution to Engineering and Business
2011 Living Legend Award from City of Durban
2012 Invited to Bill Clinton Global Initiative

Controversy 
In 2013, his company, Edison Power, was accused of corruption after being awarded a R1.25 billion tender, although this was later cleared.

A July 2017 news report cited a forensic investigation that claims that Reddy's Edison group's R1.2 billion contract "did not comply with legislative and administrative requirements".

In 2019 Reddy was linked to corruption allegations with Ace Magashule

Personal life 
Reddy and his first wife, Mogi Naidoo, share three children, Yavini, a paediatrician, Shantan, and IT student Kuber. He is currently married to Sorisha Naidoo, a TV/radio presenter, Scandal actress, and cast member of The Real Housewives of Durban. He and Sorisha have two children: a four-year-old son, Saihil and an 18-month-old daughter, Kalina.

For his 60th birthday, Reddy spent R10 million on an extravagant celebration at his personal residence with 150 close family, friends and prominent political figures.

References

External links

Wingen Heights Secondary School

Year of birth missing (living people)
Living people
South African businesspeople